

Events

Pre-1600
 421 – Emperor Theodosius II marries Aelia Eudocia at Constantinople (Byzantine Empire).
 879 – Pope John VIII recognizes the Duchy of Croatia under Duke Branimir as an independent state.
1002 – Henry II, a cousin of Emperor Otto III, is elected and crowned King of Germany.
1099 – First Crusade: The Siege of Jerusalem begins.
1420 – Troops of the Republic of Venice capture Udine, ending the independence of the Patria del Friuli.
1494 – Spain and Portugal sign the Treaty of Tordesillas which divides the New World between the two countries.

1601–1900
1628 – The Petition of Right, a major English constitutional document, is granted the Royal Assent by Charles I and becomes law.
1654 – Louis XIV is crowned King of France.
1692 – Port Royal, Jamaica, is hit by a catastrophic earthquake; in just three minutes, 1,600 people are killed and 3,000 are seriously injured.
1776 – Richard Henry Lee presents the "Lee Resolution" to the Continental Congress. The motion is seconded by John Adams and will lead to the United States Declaration of Independence.
1788 – French Revolution: Day of the Tiles: Civilians in Grenoble toss roof tiles and various objects down upon royal troops.
1800 – David Thompson reaches the mouth of the Saskatchewan River in Manitoba.
1810 – The newspaper Gazeta de Buenos Ayres is first published in Argentina.
1832 – The Great Reform Act of England and Wales receives royal assent.
  1832   – Asian cholera reaches Quebec, brought by Irish immigrants, and kills about 6,000 people in Lower Canada.
1862 – The United States and the United Kingdom agree in the Lyons–Seward Treaty to suppress the African slave trade.
1866 – One thousand eight hundred Fenian raiders are repelled back to the United States after looting and plundering the Saint-Armand and Frelighsburg areas of Canada East.
1880 – War of the Pacific: The Battle of Arica, the assault and capture of Morro de Arica (Arica Cape), ends the Campaña del Desierto (Desert Campaign).
1892 – Homer Plessy is arrested for refusing to leave his seat in the "whites-only" car of a train; he lost the resulting court case, Plessy v. Ferguson.
1899 – American Temperance crusader Carrie Nation begins her campaign of vandalizing alcohol-serving establishments by destroying the inventory in a saloon in Kiowa, Kansas.

1901–present
1905 – Norway's parliament dissolves its union with Sweden. The vote was confirmed by a national plebiscite on August 13 of that year.
1906 – Cunard Line's  is launched from the John Brown Shipyard, Glasgow (Clydebank), Scotland.
1917 – World War I: Battle of Messines: Allied soldiers detonate a series of mines underneath German trenches at Messines Ridge, killing 10,000 German troops.
1919 – Sette Giugno: Nationalist riots break out in Valletta, the capital of Malta. British soldiers fire into the crowd, killing four people.
1929 – The Lateran Treaty is ratified, bringing Vatican City into existence.
1938 – The Douglas DC-4E makes its first test flight.
  1938   – Second Sino-Japanese War: The Chinese Nationalist government creates the 1938 Yellow River flood to halt Japanese forces. Five hundred to nine hundred thousand civilians are killed.
1940 – King Haakon VII, Crown Prince Olav and the Norwegian government leave Tromsø and go into exile in London. They return exactly five years later.
1942 – World War II: The Battle of Midway ends in American victory.
  1942   – World War II: Aleutian Islands Campaign: Imperial Japanese soldiers begin occupying the American islands of Attu and Kiska, in the Aleutian Islands off Alaska.
1944 – World War II: The steamer Danae, carrying 350 Cretan Jews and 250 Cretan partisans, is sunk without survivors off the shore of Santorini.
  1944   – World War II: Battle of Normandy: At Ardenne Abbey, members of the SS Division Hitlerjugend massacre 23 Canadian prisoners of war.
1945 – King Haakon VII of Norway returns from exactly five years in exile during World War II.
1946 – The United Kingdom's BBC returns to broadcasting its television service, which has been off air for seven years because of World War II. 
1948 – Anti-Jewish riots in Oujda and Jerada take place.
  1948   – Edvard Beneš resigns as President of Czechoslovakia rather than signing the Ninth-of-May Constitution, making his nation a Communist state.
1955 – Lux Radio Theatre signs off the air permanently. The show launched in New York in 1934, and featured radio adaptations of Broadway shows and popular films.
1962 – The Organisation Armée Secrète (OAS) sets fire to the University of Algiers library building, destroying about 500,000 books.
1965 – The Supreme Court of the United States hands down its decision in Griswold v. Connecticut, prohibiting the states from criminalizing the use of contraception by married couples.
1967 – Six-Day War: Israeli soldiers enter Jerusalem.
1971 – The United States Supreme Court overturns the conviction of Paul Cohen for disturbing the peace, setting the precedent that vulgar writing is protected under the First Amendment to the United States Constitution.
  1971   – The Alcohol, Tobacco, and Firearms Division of the U.S. Internal Revenue Service raids the home of Ken Ballew for illegal possession of hand grenades.
1975 – Sony launches Betamax, the first videocassette recorder format. 
1977 – Five hundred million people watch the high day of the Silver Jubilee of Queen Elizabeth II begin on television.
1981 – The Israeli Air Force destroys Iraq's Osiraq nuclear reactor during Operation Opera.
1982 – Priscilla Presley opens Graceland to the public; the bathroom where Elvis Presley died five years earlier is kept off-limits.
1989 – Surinam Airways Flight 764 crashes on approach to Paramaribo-Zanderij International Airport in Suriname because of pilot error, killing 176 of 187 aboard.
2000 – The United Nations defines the Blue Line as the border between Israel and Lebanon.
2017 – A Myanmar Air Force Shaanxi Y-8 crashes into the Andaman Sea near Dawei, Myanmar, killing all 122 aboard.

Births

Pre-1600
1003 – Emperor Jingzong of Western Xia (d. 1048)
1402 – Ichijō Kaneyoshi, Japanese noble (d. 1481)
1422 – Federico da Montefeltro, Italian condottiero (d. 1482)
1502 – John III of Portugal (d. 1557)
1529 – Étienne Pasquier, French lawyer and jurist (d. 1615)
1561 – John VII, Count of Nassau-Siegen, German count and military theorist (d. 1623)

1601–1900
1687 – Gaetano Berenstadt, Italian actor and singer (d. 1734)
1702 – Louis George, Margrave of Baden-Baden (d. 1761)
1757 – Georgiana Cavendish, Duchess of Devonshire (d. 1806)
1761 – John Rennie the Elder, Scottish engineer (d. 1821)
1770 – Robert Jenkinson, 2nd Earl of Liverpool, English politician, Prime Minister of the United Kingdom (d. 1828)
1778 – Beau Brummell, English cricketer and fashion designer (d. 1840)
1811 – James Young Simpson, Scottish obstetrician (d. 1870)
1831 – Amelia Edwards, English journalist and author (d. 1892)
1837 – Alois Hitler, Austrian civil servant (d. 1903)
1840 – Carlota of Mexico (d. 1927)
1845 – Leopold Auer, Hungarian violinist, composer, and conductor (d. 1930)
1847 – George Washington Ball, American legislator from Iowa (d. 1915) 
1848 – Paul Gauguin, French painter and sculptor (d. 1903)
1851 – Ture Malmgren, Swedish journalist and politician (d. 1922)
1861 – Robina Nicol, New Zealand photographer and suffragist (d. 1942)
1862 – Philipp Lenard, Slovak-German physicist and academic, Nobel Prize laureate (d. 1947)
1863 – Bones Ely, American baseball player and manager (d. 1952)
1868 – Charles Rennie Mackintosh, Scottish painter and architect (d. 1928)
1877 – Roelof Klein, Dutch-American rower and engineer (d. 1960)
1879 – Knud Rasmussen, Danish anthropologist and explorer (d. 1933)
  1879   – Joan Voûte, Dutch astronomer and academic (d. 1963)
1884 – Ester Claesson, Swedish landscape architect (d. 1931)
1883 – Sylvanus Morley, American archaeologist and scholar (d. 1948)
1886 – Henri Coandă, Romanian engineer, designed the Coandă-1910 (d. 1972)
1888 – Clarence DeMar, American runner and educator (d. 1958)
1892 – Leo Reise, Canadian ice hockey player (d. 1975)
1893 – Gillis Grafström, Swedish figure skater and architect (d. 1938)
1894 – Alexander P. de Seversky, Georgian-American pilot and engineer, co-designed the Republic P-47 Thunderbolt (d. 1974)
1896 – Douglas Campbell, American lieutenant and pilot (d. 1990)
  1896   – Robert S. Mulliken, American physicist and chemist, Nobel Prize laureate (d. 1986)
  1896   – Imre Nagy, Hungarian soldier and politician, 44th Prime Minister of Hungary (d. 1958)
1897 – George Szell, Hungarian-American conductor and composer (d. 1970)
1899 – Elizabeth Bowen, Anglo-Irish author and critic (d. 1973)

1901–present
1902 – Georges Van Parys, French composer (d. 1971)
  1902   – Herman B Wells, American banker, author, and academic (d. 2000)
1905 – James J. Braddock, American world heavyweight boxing champion (d. 1974)
1906 – Glen Gray, American saxophonist and bandleader (d. 1963)
1907 – Sigvard Bernadotte, Count of Wisborg (d. 2002)
1909 – Virginia Apgar, American anesthesiologist and pediatrician, developed the Apgar test (d. 1974)
  1909   – Peter W. Rodino, American lawyer, and politician (d. 2005)
  1909   – Jessica Tandy, English-American actress (d. 1994)
1910 – Arthur Gardner, American actor and producer (d. 2014)
  1910   – Mike Sebastian, American football player and coach (d. 1989)
  1910   – Bradford Washburn, American mountaineer, photographer, and cartographer (d. 2007)
  1910   – Marion Post Wolcott, American photographer (d. 1990)
1911 – Brooks Stevens, American engineer and designer, designed the Wienermobile (d. 1995)
1912 – Jacques Hélian, French bandleader (d. 1986)
1917 – Gwendolyn Brooks, American poet (d. 2000)
  1917   – Dean Martin, American singer, actor, and producer (d. 1995)
1920 – Georges Marchais, French mechanic and politician (d. 1997)
1923 – Jules Deschênes, Canadian lawyer and judge (d. 2000)
1925 – Ernestina Herrera de Noble, Argentine publisher and executive (d. 2017)
1926 – Jean-Noël Tremblay, Canadian lawyer and politician (d. 2020)
1927 – Paul Salamunovich, American conductor and educator (d. 2014)
1928 – James Ivory, American director, producer, and screenwriter
1929 – John Turner, Canadian lawyer and politician, 17th Prime Minister of Canada (d. 2020)
1931 – Virginia McKenna, English actress and author
1932 – Per Maurseth, Norwegian historian, academic, and politician (d. 2013)
1935 – Harry Crews, American novelist, playwright, short story writer, and essayist (d. 2012)
1936 – Bert Sugar, American author and boxing historian (d. 2012)
1938 – Ian St John, Scottish international footballer and manager (d. 2021) 
1939 – Yuli Turovsky, Russian-Canadian cellist, conductor and educator (d. 2013)
1940 – Tom Jones, Welsh singer and actor
  1940   – Ronald Pickup, English actor (d. 2021)
1944 – Clarence White, American guitarist and singer (d. 1973)
1945 – Wolfgang Schüssel, Austrian lawyer and politician, 26th Chancellor of Austria
1946 – Zbigniew Seifert, Polish musician (d. 1979)
1947 – Thurman Munson, American baseball player (d. 1979)
1952 – Liam Neeson, Irish-American actor
  1952   – Orhan Pamuk, Turkish-American novelist, screenwriter, and academic, Nobel Prize laureate
1954 – Louise Erdrich, American novelist and poet
1957 – Juan Luis Guerra, Dominican singer, composer, and record producer.
1958 – Prince, American singer-songwriter, multi-instrumentalist, producer, and actor (d. 2016)
1959 – Mike Pence, 48th Vice President of the United States, 50th Governor of Indiana
1960 – Bill Prady, American screenwriter and producer
  1962   – Lance Reddick,  American actor (d. 2023)
1965 – Damien Hirst, English painter and art collector
  1965   – Mick Foley, American professional wrestler and author
1967 – Dave Navarro, American musician
1970 – Cafu, Brazilian footballer
1974 – Bear Grylls, English adventurer, author, and television host
1975 – Allen Iverson, American basketball player
1978 – Bill Hader, American actor, comedian, and screenwriter
1981 – Anna Kournikova, Russian tennis player
1988 – Michael Cera, Canadian actor and musician
1990 – Iggy Azalea, Australian rapper, singer, songwriter, and model
1991 – Fetty Wap, American rapper, singer, and songwriter
  1991   – Emily Ratajkowski, American model and actress
1993 – George Ezra, English singer-songwriter
1996 – Christian McCaffrey, American football player

Deaths

Pre-1600
 555 – Vigilius, pope of the Catholic Church (b. 500)
 862 – Al-Muntasir, Abbasid caliph (b. 837)
 929 – Ælfthryth, Countess of Flanders (b. 877)
 940 – Qian Hongzun, heir apparent of Wuyue (b. 925)
 951 – Lu Wenji, Chinese chancellor (b. 876)
1329 – Robert the Bruce, Scottish king (b. 1274)
1337 – William I, Count of Hainaut (b. 1286)
1341 – An-Nasir Muhammad, Egyptian sultan (b. 1285)
1358 – Ashikaga Takauji, Japanese shōgun (b. 1305)
1394 – Anne of Bohemia, English queen (b. 1366)
1492 – Casimir IV Jagiellon, Grand Duke of Lithuania from 1440 and King of Poland from 1447 (b. 1427)
1594 – Rodrigo Lopez, physician of Queen Elizabeth (b. 1525)

1601–1900
1618 – Thomas West, 3rd Baron De La Warr, English politician, Colonial Governor of Virginia (b. 1577)
1660 – George II Rákóczi, Prince of Transylvania (b. 1621)
1711 – Henry Dodwell, Irish scholar and theologian (b. 1641)
1740 – Alexander Spotswood, Moroccan-American colonial and politician, Lieutenant Governor of Virginia (b. 1676)
1779 – William Warburton, English bishop and critic (b. 1698)
1792 – Benjamin Tupper, American general and surveyor (b. 1738)
1810 – Luigi Schiavonetti, Italian engraver and etcher (b. 1765)
1826 – Joseph von Fraunhofer, German optician, physicist, and astronomer (b. 1787)
1840 – Frederick William III of Prussia (b. 1770)
1843 – Friedrich Hölderlin, German lyric poet and author (b. 1770)
1853 – Norbert Provencher, Canadian missionary and bishop (b. 1787)
1854 – Charles Baudin, French admiral (b. 1792)
1859 – David Cox, English painter (b. 1783)
1861 – Patrick Brontë, Anglo-Irish priest and author (b. 1777)
1863 – Antonio Valero de Bernabé, Latin American liberator (b. 1790)
1866 – Chief Seattle, American tribal chief (b. 1780)
1879 – William Tilbury Fox, English dermatologist and academic (b. 1836)
1896 – Pavlos Carrer, Greek composer (b. 1829)

1901–present
1911 – Maurice Rouvier, French politician, Prime Minister of France (b. 1842)
1915 – Charles Reed Bishop, American banker and politician, founded the First Hawaiian Bank (b. 1822)
1916 – Émile Faguet, French author and critic (b. 1847)
1921 – Patrick Maher, executed Irish republican (b. 1889)
  1921   – Edmond Foley, executed Irish republican (b. 1897)
1924 – William Pirrie, 1st Viscount Pirrie, Irish businessman and politician, Lord Mayor of Belfast (b. 1847)
1927 – Archie Birkin, English motorcycle racer (b. 1905)
  1927   – Edmund James Flynn, Canadian lawyer and politician, 10th Premier of Quebec (b. 1847)
1932 – John Verran, English-Australian politician, 26th Premier of South Australia (b. 1856)
1933 – Dragutin Domjanić, Croatian lawyer, judge, and poet (b. 1875)
1936 – Stjepan Seljan, Croatian explorer (b. 1875)
1937 – Jean Harlow, American actress and singer (b. 1911)
1942 – Alan Blumlein, English engineer (b. 1903)
1945 – Kitaro Nishida, Japanese philosopher and academic (b. 1870)
1954 – Alan Turing, English mathematician and computer scientist (b. 1912)
1956 – John Willcock, Australian politician, 15th Premier of Western Australia (b. 1879)
1965 – Judy Holliday, American actress and singer (b. 1921)
1966 – Jean Arp, German-French sculptor, painter, and poet (b. 1886)
1967 – Anatoly Maltsev, Russian mathematician and academic (b. 1909)
  1967   – Dorothy Parker, American poet, short story writer, critic, and satirist (b. 1893)
1968 – Dan Duryea, American actor and singer (b. 1907)
1970 – E. M. Forster, English novelist, short story writer, essayist (b. 1879)
1978 – Ronald George Wreyford Norrish, English chemist and academic, Nobel Prize laureate (b. 1897)
1980 – Elizabeth Craig, Scottish journalist and economist (b. 1883)
  1980   – Philip Guston, Canadian-American painter and educator (b. 1913)
  1980   – Henry Miller, American novelist and essayist (b. 1891)
1985 – Klaudia Taev, Estonian opera singer and educator (b. 1906)
1987 – Cahit Zarifoğlu, Turkish poet and author (b. 1940)
1992 – Bill France Sr., American race car driver and businessman, co-founded NASCAR (b. 1909)
1995 – Hsuan Hua, Chinese monk and educator (b. 1918)
2001 – Víctor Paz Estenssoro, Bolivian politician, 52nd President of Bolivia (b. 1907)
  2001   – Betty Neels, English nurse and author (b. 1910)
2002 – Signe Hasso, Swedish-American actress (b. 1915)
2012 – Phillip V. Tobias, South African paleontologist and academic (b. 1925)
2013 – Pierre Mauroy, French educator and politician, Prime Minister of France (b. 1928)
2015 – Christopher Lee, English actor (b. 1922)

Holidays and observances

 Christian feast day:
Antonio Maria Gianelli
Colmán of Dromore
St Gottschalk
Landulf of Yariglia (Asti)
Meriasek 
Paul I of Constantinople
Robert of Newminster
Chief Seattle (Lutheran Church)
Blessed Marie-Thérèse de Soubiran La Louvière
Commemoration Day of St John the Forerunner (Armenian Apostolic Church)
Pioneers of the Episcopal Anglican Church of Brazil (Episcopal Church (USA))
June 7 (Eastern Orthodox liturgics)
Battle of Arica Day (Arica y Parinacota Region, Chile)
Flag Day (Peru)
Journalist Day (Argentina)
Anniversary of the Memorandum of the Slovak Nation (Slovakia)
Birthday of Prince Joachim (Denmark)
Sette Giugno (Malta)
Union Dissolution Day (Independence Day of Norway)
Tourette Syndrome Awareness Day

References

External links

 
 
 

Days of the year
June